Riverbend is a neighborhood within the city limits of Tampa, Florida. As of the 2000 census the neighborhood had a population of 1,980. The ZIP Codes serving the neighborhood are 33603 and 33604.

Geography
Riverbend boundaries are Hillsborough Avenue to the south, the Lowry Park District to the north, Hillsborough River to the east, and the Rome Avenue to the west.

Demographics
Source: Hillsborough County Atlas

As of the census of 2000, there were 1,980 people and 855 households residing in the neighborhood. The population density was 4,555/mi2. The racial makeup of the neighborhood was 82% White, 9% African American, 1% Native American, less than 1% Asian, 6% from other races, and 2% from two or more races. Hispanic or Latino of any race were 34% of the population.

There were 855 households, out of which 30% had children under the age of 18 living with them, 36% were married couples living together, 18% had a female householder with no husband present, and 8% were non-families. 33% of all households were made up of individuals.

In the neighborhood the population was spread out, with 26% under the age of 18, 20% from 18 to 34, 24% from 35 to 49, 17% from 50 to 64, and 16% who were 65 years of age or older. For every 100 females, there were 103.3 males.

The per capita income for the neighborhood was $16,050. About 17% of the population were below the poverty line, 40% of those were under the age of 18.

See also
Neighborhoods in Tampa, Florida

References

External links
Riverbend Civic Association

Neighborhoods in Tampa, Florida